Gabriele Gardel (born 22 October 1977 in Milan, Italy) is a Swiss racing driver. He is the  2005 FIA GT Champion.

Career 
Complete chronology:
 1995: Formula Ford, best finish: 4th.
 1996: Italian F3, Italian runner, best driver under 21 (2 wins, 7 podiums).
 1997: Italian F3, best finish: 6th.
 1998: Italian F3, best finish: 5th.
 1999: German F3, Junior Team Benetton, best finish: 4th.
 2000–2002: Euroseries 3000, 8th absolute.
 2003: 2003 FIA GT Championship season, N-GT class best finish: 3rd.
 2004: 2004 FIA GT Championship season, vice world champion GT1 (2 wins, 7 podiums) with Ferrari Ferrari 550-GTS Maranello.
 2005: 2005 FIA GT Championship season, GT1 World Champion (3 wins, 6 podiums) with Ferrari 550-GTS Maranello.
 2006: 2006 Le Mans Series season, World Champion GT1 (2 wins, 3 podiums) with Aston Martin DBR9.
 2007: 2007 Le Mans Series season, 4th absolute GT1 category (5 podiums) with Aston Martin DBR9.
 2007: 24 Hours of Silverstone, 3rd absolute category GTR.
 2008: Grand-Am, best finish: 6th and participation in the 2008 24 Hours of Daytona.
 2009: Porsche Carrera Cup Italy.
 2010: 2010 Le Mans Series season, LMS GT1 champion with Ford Saleen S7R.
 2010: 24 Hours of Le Mans, GT1 winner with Saleen S7R with Ford.
 2010: 2010 Intercontinental Le Mans Cup, Intercontinental Champion with Ford Saleen S7R in GT1 category.
 2011: 24 Hours of Le Mans, winner of the GTE-am class with Corvette C6 – ZR1.
 2011: 2011 Intercontinental Le Mans Cup Intercontinental Champion category Gt-am with Corvette C6-ZR1.
 2012: 2012 Blancpain Endurance Series season with Emil Frey GT3 Jaguar Racing and 2012 International GT Open season with Maserati MC3.
 2013: 2013 Blancpain Endurance Series season with Emil Frey GT3 Jaguar Racing and 2013 Italian GT Championship season with Porsche.
 2014: 2014 Blancpain Endurance Series season with Emil Frey GT3 Jaguar Racing. Trofeo Maserati, 4th absolute (2 wins, 6 podiums). NASCAR Whelen Euro Series 2 Elite 2 race winner at Le Mans.
 2015: 2015 Blancpain Endurance Series season with Emil Frey GT3 Jaguar Racing.

Motorsport results

24 Hours of Le Mans results

NASCAR
(key) (Bold – Pole position awarded by qualifying time. Italics – Pole position earned by points standings or practice time. * – Most laps led.)

Whelen Euro Series – Elite 2

References

External links

Official website

1977 births
Living people
Swiss racing drivers
FIA GT Championship drivers
24 Hours of Le Mans drivers
NASCAR drivers
Emil Frey Racing drivers
Larbre Compétition drivers
Blancpain Endurance Series drivers
Piquet GP drivers